The Saturday Magazine may refer to either:
 The Saturday Magazine (radio show) a radio show on BBC radio Ulster
 The Saturday Magazine (magazine) a 19th-century British weekly magazine